Tristan Black (born April 8, 1984) is a former professional Canadian football linebacker. He was drafted by the Calgary Stampeders in the second round of the 2009 CFL Draft. He played college football for the Wayne State Warriors. He attended Central Tech and Northern Secondary in Toronto, Ontario.

Professional career
Black was drafted by the Calgary Stampeders with the 16th overall pick in the second round of the 2009 CFL Draft and signed with the club on May 29, 2009. He played with the Stampeders for five games until sustaining an ankle injury, keeping him out of the lineup well into the 2010 season. Upon his recovery and activation from the nine-game injured list, Black was traded to the Toronto Argonauts on August 22, 2010. He played for two and a half seasons with his hometown Argonauts, including the 2012 season when he was a member of the 100th Grey Cup winning team. Upon entering free agency, he with the Saskatchewan Roughriders on February 16, 2013. He won his second consecutive Grey Cup championship with the Roughriders during their 101st Grey Cup victory. Following two years with the team, Black was released by the Roughriders on January 6, 2015.

References

External links
 Saskatchewan Roughriders bio
 Toronto Argonauts profile
 Wayne State Warriors bio

1984 births
Living people
Black Canadian players of Canadian football
Calgary Stampeders players
Canadian football linebackers
Canadian players of American football
Players of Canadian football from Ontario
Saskatchewan Roughriders players
Sportspeople from Toronto
Toronto Argonauts players
Wayne State Warriors football players